Rudolph Contreras (born December 6, 1962) is a United States district judge of the United States District Court for the District of Columbia. He also serves as Presiding Judge on the United States Foreign Intelligence Surveillance Court.

In December 2017 he briefly presided over the case of former national security adviser Michael Flynn, accepting Flynn's guilty plea, but was later recused from the case.

Early life and education
Contreras was born in 1962 in Miami, Florida, to Cuban immigrant parents and raised in Miami. He received a Bachelor of Science from Florida State University in 1984 and a Juris Doctor from University of Pennsylvania Law School in 1991.

Federal judicial service
On July 28, 2011, President Barack Obama nominated Contreras to fill a vacancy on the United States District Court for the District of Columbia to replace Judge Ricardo M. Urbina, who assumed senior status in 2011. On October 4, 2011, the Senate Judiciary Committee held a hearing on his nomination and on October 3, 2011, reported his nomination to the floor of the Senate. On March 22, 2012, the Senate confirmed Contreras in a voice vote. He received his commission on March 23, 2012.

In April 2016 Chief Justice John Roberts appointed Contreras to the United States Foreign Intelligence Surveillance Court for a term starting May 19, 2016. On May 19, 2021, Contreras was named the Presiding Judge.

Notable cases
On November 17, 2016, Contreras dismissed a lawsuit against U.S. Senate Majority Leader Mitch McConnell seeking to compel a vote on the U.S. Supreme Court nomination of Merrick Garland, finding that the plaintiff, who had simply alleged he was a voter, had no standing to sue. 

In 2017 Contreras was randomly assigned the case of United States of America v. Michael T. Flynn, the former National Security Adviser to President Donald Trump. The two-page indictment was released on December 1, 2017. Contreras accepted Flynn's guilty plea to one count of making false statements to the FBI in the course of their investigation into Russian interference in the 2016 U.S. presidential election. The guilty plea was part of a plea bargain with the Special Counsel investigation led by Robert S. Mueller III. On December 7, 2017, Contreras was recused from further sentencing hearings scheduled to take place in the future. The case was randomly reassigned to District Judge Emmet G. Sullivan.
According to several reputable sources, text messages show that Peter Strzok, a veteran FBI counterintelligence official who worked on the Flynn case as part of Mueller's team, knew Contreras.

On August 6, 2020, Contreras dismissed a lawsuit filed by House Republicans against U.S. House Speaker Nancy Pelosi that challenged proxy voting rules adopted during the 2020 COVID-19 pandemic. He ruled that the Constitution's "Speech or Debate Clause" prohibited lawsuits over Congress' legislative efforts. He concluded that "the Court can conceive of few other actions, besides actually debating, speaking, or voting, that could more accurately be described as 'legislative' than the regulation of how votes may be cast".

On March 5, 2021, Contreras ruled that the states of Illinois, Nevada, and Virginia had ratified the Equal Rights Amendment too late – as it had occurred after the congressionally-imposed 1982 deadline – for the amendment to be valid.

See also
List of Hispanic/Latino American jurists

References

External links

1962 births
Living people
21st-century American judges
American people of Cuban descent
Assistant United States Attorneys
Florida State University alumni
Hispanic and Latino American judges
Jones Day people
Judges of the United States District Court for the District of Columbia
Judges of the United States Foreign Intelligence Surveillance Court
United States district court judges appointed by Barack Obama
University of Pennsylvania Law School alumni